The Northern California Folk-Rock Festival was a music festival held at Family Park in the Santa Clara County Fairgrounds, 344 Tully Road, San Jose, California, on May 18–19, 1968 and promoted by Bob Blodgett. It was the first of two such festivals held at the venue, being followed by the Northern California Folk-Rock Festival (1969).

The festival featured Country Joe and the Fish, The Animals, Jefferson Airplane, The Doors, Big Brother and the Holding Company feat. Janis Joplin, The Youngbloods, The Electric Flag, Kaleidoscope, Taj Mahal, and Ravi Shankar. And although not mentioned in the promotional material, the Grateful Dead also performed.

Linda Segul created a poster. Carson-Morris Studios also created a poster featuring Jim Morrison.

See also
List of historic rock festivals
List of music festivals in the United States

References

External links
The Doors Concert Dates & Info - Northern California Folk Rock Festival 1968
http://newdoorstalk.proboards.com/thread/2486/northern-california-folk-rock-festival
Electric Flag played their last big show at the Northern California Folk Rock Festival

Folk festivals in the United States
Concerts in the United States
Hippie movement
Rock festivals in the United States
1968 in American music
Festivals in the San Francisco Bay Area
1968 in California
Music festivals established in 1968
1968 music festivals
May 1968 events in the United States